System under test (SUT) refers to a system that is being tested for correct operation. According to ISTQB it is the test object.  
From a Unit Testing perspective, the SUT represents all of the classes in a test that are not predefined pieces of code like stubs or even mocks. Each one of this can have its own configuration (a name and a version), making it scalable for a series of tests to get more and more precise, according to the quantity of quality of the system in test.

See also 
 Device under test
 Test harness

References

External links 
 xUnit Patterns SUT
 6 goldene Regeln der Testautomatisierung im Softwaretest (in German)
 Test Procedure for §170.314(c) Clinical quality measures

Software quality
Systems engineering